Francisco Rodríguez Murillo (born February 26, 1983) is a Mexican professional baseball pitcher for the Tecolotes de los Dos Laredos of the Mexican League. He previously played in Major League Baseball (MLB) for the Los Angeles Angels of Anaheim.

Career

Pericos de Puebla
Rodríguez began his career in the Mexican League in 2005 with the Pericos de Puebla. In 33 appearances for Puebla, Rodríguez logged a 4-4 record and 5.61 ERA with 36 strikeouts in 85.0 innings of work.

Los Angeles Angels
On December 26, 2005, Rodríguez signed a minor league contract with the Los Angeles Angels of Anaheim. In 2006, he won the California League Pitcher of the Week honors while pitching for the High-A Rancho Cucamonga Quakes. On the year, he logged a 5-13 record and 5.47 ERA in 26 appearances. For the 2007 season, Rodríguez returned to Rancho Cucamonga and posted a 4-8 record and 5.96 ERA in 39 games with the team. The next year, Rodriguez played in Double-A with the Arkansas Travelers, pitching to a 5-5 record and 3.82 ERA with 69 strikeouts in 75.1 innings pitched. In 2009, he played for the Triple-A Salt Lake Bees, recording a 5-4 record and 3.96 ERA with 60 strikeouts in 44 appearances.

On April 14, 2010, Rodríguez was selected to the 40-man roster and promoted to the major leagues for the first time after closer Brian Fuentes was placed on the disabled list. He made his major league debut the next day, pitching 1 scoreless inning against the New York Yankees. He finished his rookie season with a 4.37 ERA and 36 strikeouts in 43 major league games with the Angels. In 2011, Rodríguez made 10 appearances for the Angels, posting a 4.61 ERA, but missed much of the year with right shoulder inflammation. On November 17, 2011, Rodríguez was outrighted off of the 40-man roster. He was assigned to Triple-A Salt Lake to begin the 2012 season. After struggling to a 6.35 ERA in 40 appearances, on August 7, 2012, Rodríguez was released by the Angels organization.

Tigres de Quintana Roo
On March 20, 2013, Rodríguez signed with the Tigres de Quintana Roo of the Mexican League. For the 2013 season, Rodríguez recorded a 3-4 record and 4.47 ERA in 47 appearances. The next year, he registered a 4-7 record and 4.26 ERA with 42 strikeouts in 50.2 innings pitched. In 2015, he pitched in 35 contests for the Tigres, logging a 4.25 ERA in 36.0 innings of work.

Leones de Yucatán
On July 14, 2015, he was traded to the Leones de Yucatán. He finished the year with a stellar 0.63 ERA in 15 appearances for Yucatán. In 2016, Rodríguez logged a 2.98 ERA with 28 strikeouts in 42.1 innings pitched. Rodríguez re-signed with the Leones on April 4, 2017. On the year, Rodríguez posted an 8-6 record and 3.34 ERA with 53 strikeouts in 97.0 innings of work.

Olmecas de Tabasco
On December 21, 2017, Rodríguez was traded to the Olmecas de Tabasco in exchange for Kristian Delgado. In 2018, he pitched to a 5-8 record with 57 strikeouts in 109.0 innings of work. In 11 games for Tabasco in 2019, Rodríguez recorded a 4-4 record and 7.80 ERA.

Piratas de Campeche
On June 9, 2019, Rodríguez was loaned to the Piratas de Campeche. Rodríguez made 4 appearances for Campeche in 2019, posting a 1-1 record and 6.64 ERA with 11 strikeouts.

Saraperos de Saltillo
On July 20, 2019, the Piratas loaned Rodríguez to the Saraperos de Saltillo. Rodríguez made one appearance for the club, pitching 5.1 innings of 4-run ball. On October 4, he was returned to the Piratas de Campeche.

Rieleros de Aguascalientes
On December 9, 2019, Rodríguez was traded to the Rieleros de Aguascalientes, but was released prior to the season, which was later cancelled due to the COVID-19 pandemic, on March 24, 2020. On February 11, 2021, Rodríguez re-signed with the Rieleros for the upcoming season. After pitching a scoreless inning with Aguascalientes, he was released on June 16, 2021.

Tecolotes de los Dos Laredos
On June 20, 2021, Rodríguez signed with the Tecolotes de los Dos Laredos of the Mexican League.

International career
He was selected Mexico national baseball team at 2009 World Baseball Classic, 2013 World Baseball Classic and 2019 exhibition games against Japan.

References

External links

1983 births
Living people
Águilas de Mexicali players
Arizona League Angels players
Arkansas Travelers players
Baseball players from Baja California
Cañeros de Los Mochis players
Leones de Yucatán players
Los Angeles Angels players
Major League Baseball pitchers
Major League Baseball players from Mexico
Mexican expatriate baseball players in the United States
Mexican League baseball pitchers
Olmecas de Tabasco players
Sportspeople from Mexicali
Pericos de Puebla players
Piratas de Campeche players
Rancho Cucamonga Quakes players
Salt Lake Bees players
Tigres de Quintana Roo players
Tomateros de Culiacán players
Yaquis de Obregón players
2009 World Baseball Classic players
2013 World Baseball Classic players